The Vagabond Queen may refer to:

 The Vagabond Queen (film), a 1929 British film directed by Géza von Bolváry
 The Vagabond Queen (opera), an opera by Edward Barnes